Laurie Cahill (22 September 1912 – 6 December 1974) was an Australian rules footballer who played for South Adelaide in the South Australian National Football League (SANFL) and Richmond in the Victorian Football League (VFL).

Career 
Cahill, the uncle of coaching great John, played as both a rover and wingman during his career. A premiership player in 1935 and 1938, he won South Adelaide's 'best and fairest' in the second of those years as well as in 1939. 

While in Melbourne in 1943, Cahill made seven appearances for Richmond. He was the team's top goal-kicker in the Preliminary Final win over Fitzroy, with three goals and also participated in their premiership a week later.

He continued playing for four years after returning to South Adelaide and then coached the club in 1947 and 1948, as well as another stint later in 1957. In between, from 1953 to 1956, Cahill was in charge of West Adelaide and coached them to a couple of Grand Final losses.

A South Australian representative at the 1937 Perth Carnival, Cahill played a total of 11 interstate matches over the years. He is a wingman in South Adelaide's official 'Greatest Team'.

References
Holmesby, Russell and Main, Jim (2007). The Encyclopedia of AFL Footballers. 7th ed. Melbourne: Bas Publishing.

External links

1912 births
1974 deaths
Richmond Football Club players
Richmond Football Club Premiership players
South Adelaide Football Club players
South Adelaide Football Club coaches
West Adelaide Football Club coaches
Australian rules footballers from South Australia
South Australian Football Hall of Fame inductees
One-time VFL/AFL Premiership players